Perfect Target is a 1997 Mexican-American action/thriller film directed by Sheldon Lettich and starring Daniel Bernhardt.

Plot
A former soldier finds mercenary work as security for the president of a foreign country and becomes the fall guy for an assassination plot. He escapes and joins the rebels to clear his name and expose the true person behind the president's assassination.

Cast
 Daniel Bernhardt as David Benson
 Jim Pirri as Miguel Ramirez
 Dara Tomanovich as Teresa Ramirez
 Robert Englund as Colonel Shakwell
 Brian Thompson as Major Oxnard
 Julieta Rosen as Isabela Santiago Casillas
 Mario Iván Martínez as President Casillas
 Bob Koherr as Mason
 Terrence Stone as Stiles
 Oscar Dillon as Washington
 Ramiro González as Peoples
 Jimmi Hefner as Pablo
 Pedro Castillo as Joselito
 Guy De Saint Cyr as General Baez
 René Gatica as Vice President Azusa

Production
Filming took place in Jalisco, Nayarit, and Puerto Vallarta, Mexico.

Release
The film was released direct-to-video in Germany on April 28, 1997. It was not released in the US until September 11, 1999.

References

External links
 

1990s English-language films
1997 films
1997 action thriller films
American action thriller films
Cockfighting in film
Films shot in Mexico
Films directed by Sheldon Lettich
Films scored by David Michael Frank
Mexican action thriller films